Aunay-sous-Crécy (literally Aunay under Crécy) is a commune in the Eure-et-Loir department in northern France.

Population

See also
Communes of the Eure-et-Loir department

References

Communes of Eure-et-Loir